The 2017 CS Ondrej Nepela Trophy was held in September 2017. It is an annual senior international figure skating competition held in Bratislava, Slovakia. It was part of the 2017–18 ISU Challenger Series. Medals will be awarded in the disciplines of men's singles, ladies' singles, pair skating, and ice dance.

Entries 
The International Skating Union published the full preliminary list of entries on 24 August 2017.

 Withdrew before starting orders were drawn
 Ice dance: Sofia Evdokimova / Egor Bazin (RUS)

Results

Men

Ladies

Pairs

Ice dance

References

Citations

External links 
 
 25th Ondrej Nepela Trophy at the International Skating Union
 Ondrej Nepela Trophy at the Slovak Figure Skating Association
 Results

CS Ondrej Nepela
2017 in Slovak sport